Marine Attack Squadron 141 (VMA-141) was a reserve fighter squadron in the United States Marine Corps.  The squadron fought most notably as part of the Cactus Air Force during the Battle of Guadalcanal in World War II and they also saw service during the Korean War.  While with the reserves, they operated out of the San Francisco Bay Area, until their deactivation on 1 September 1969.

History

World War II
Marine Scout Bombing Squadron (VMSB-141) was commissioned on March 1, 1942 at Camp Kearny in San Diego, California.  They were originally formed from personnel of VMSB-132.  On August 30, 1942 they departed San Diego for the South Pacific and arrived at Henderson Airfield, Guadalcanal on September 23, 1942 and became part of the Cactus Air Force (CAF).   On the night of October 13–14, the Japanese battleships Kongō and Haruna lobbed over 900 shells at Henderson Field.  During this bombardment the squadron lost 26 of its 29 aircraft and five officers, including the commanding officer and executive officer.  The squadron fought on the island until November 19, 1942 when they were transferred to Efate in the New Hebrides.  During its time with the CAF the squadron would lose 18 of its 41 officers killed in action.  They remained on Efate until May 1943 when they moved to Auckland, New Zealand.  In late September 1943, the squadron returned to the United States arriving at Marine Corps Air Station El Toro, California.  In January 1944, the squadron was ordered to Marine Corps Auxiliary Airfield Gillespie in San Diego, CA where they undertook a rigorous syllabus in low-level bombing and strafing utilizing the Vought F4U Corsair.

On October 14, 1944 the squadron was redesignated Marine Fighter Bombing Squadron 141 (VMBF-141).  In May 1945 the squadron again changed names.  This time they became Marine Torpedo Bombing Squadron 141 (VMTB-141) and served as a training replacement squadron until the end of the war.  The squadron was deactivated on September 10, 1945.

Post-World War II reserve service
Following the war the squadron was reactivated on 5 July 1946 at Naval Air Station Livermore as part of the Marine Air Reserve.  On 15 September 1946 they relocated to Naval Air Station Oakland.   In 1949 they were commanded by Medal of Honor recipient Colonel James Swett.  The squadron moved to Naval Air Station Alameda on 1 July 1962.  On that same date they also redesignated as Marine Attack Squadron 141.  The squadron was deactivated on 1 September 1969.

Notable members
 Louis Robertshaw
 Bill Bixby

See also

 United States Marine Corps Aviation
 List of decommissioned United States Marine Corps aircraft squadrons

Notes

References
Bibliography

Web

 USMC Bomber Squadron of WWII
 Historic California Posts: Marine Corps Air Station Miramar
  John Galle 212 History Page

141
Inactive units of the United States Marine Corps